Konsol Station is a station on Hyŏksin Line of the Pyongyang Metro. It is notable for being the only station in the Pyongyang Metro to use side platforms, as all other stations use an island platform configuration instead.

The station is in front of the Ryugyong Hotel and a short distance from Pyongyang University of Science and Technology, Victorious Fatherland Liberation Museum and Pyongyang Arena.

The station features the murals A Construction Site of Blast Furnace and Builders of the Capital City.

References

External links
 

Pyongyang Metro stations
Railway stations opened in 1978
1978 establishments in North Korea